Edward Markley (September 5, 1939 - January 14, 2019) was an American Catholic Benedictine monk and priest. In 1985, Markley was arrested and convicted to five years in jail after he vandalized an abortion clinic with a sledgehammer.

Life
Markley was born on September 5, 1939, and took vows as a monk at St. Bernard Abbey on June 12, 1960. He was later ordained to the Catholic priesthood on June 10, 1966.

On April 29, 1978, Markley, along with three students, was arrested at the Birmingham Women's Medical Clinic, after organizing a sit-in to protest abortion. On May 19, the four were convicted of trespassing, with Birmingham city Judge Tennant Smallwood fining Markley $50.

On May 12, 1984, Markley, along with one other man, used a sledgehammer to destroy equipment at the abortion clinic, destroying an estimated $8,000 in equipment. That year, Markley also splashed the Women's Community Health Center in Huntsville with red paint. He was ordered to pay $2,400, but he refused and was arrested. He then spent 30 days in prison until an anonymous donor paid. On June 16, 1986, he was convicted and sentenced to five years in prison, ineligible for parole, after violating probation terms to stay 500 feet away from abortion clinics. Markley reported that he did not find jail too bad and was pleased to gain some firsthand knowledge of it, having taught criminology courses in the past.

Markley's superior, Bishop Joseph Vath, issued a statement supportive of his actions, stating, "If we are convinced that abortion is the taking of innocent life according to God’s revealed word, he is not acting unjustly according to God’s law in defending the innocent unborn one...The right to life certainly supersedes the right to property or to privacy."

Markley was released from prison in 1987, after serving just over a year of his five-year sentence. His early release, with parole oversight, was credited to a combination of his exemplary behavior while in prison and an anti-abortion letter writing campaign to the parole board. After his release, Markley promised to continue his anti-abortion activism. He also “refused to apologize” for the sledgehammer incident, but stated that “on orders from his superiors he would not engage in any more destruction of property.”

Markley died peacefully at approximately 8:20 AM, January 14, 2019, at the age of 79, in the St. Bernard Abbey at Cullman. The Abbey announced his death with a statement that said "He was an exemplary monk, who will be greatly missed by his brothers."

References

Further reading
 Markley v. State, 1987.

1939 births
2019 deaths
American Benedictines
American Roman Catholic priests
People from Birmingham, Alabama